Screaming Life/Fopp is a compilation album by the American rock band Soundgarden that combines their debut EPs in their entirety into a single release. It was originally released on May 11, 1990, through Sub Pop Records. Sub Pop later remastered and re-issued the album on November 24, 2013.

Overview
The album combines the band's first two studio EPs: Screaming Life (1987) and Fopp (1988). It was released in 1990 by Sub Pop despite having been recorded in 1987-88, after Soundgarden's two subsequent full-length releases, Ultramega OK (1988) and Louder than Love (1989), had gained them considerable popularity. There are two cover songs on the album; "Swallow My Pride" is a Green River cover and "Fopp" is an Ohio Players cover.

The 2013 re-issue contains an extra track, "Sub Pop Rock City," that is not present on the original release. "Sub Pop Rock City" was a track recorded during the same pre-Ultramega OK era but previously only available on the Sub Pop 200 compilation.

Release and reception

PopMatters journalist J.C. Maçek III reviewed the 2013 remastered version of the album and said, "As for the 'remastering' aspect, to be sure, the album sounds as good as it ever has, especially to those of us who memorized every note by way of audio cassettes. However, the new version doesn't sound markedly different from the previous release on CD, mostly because the songs were recorded tough and rough in the first place."

Track listing
All lyrics written by Chris Cornell, all music composed by Kim Thayil, except where noted.

Original release

Remastered 2013 release

Chart performance

Personnel

Soundgarden
Chris Cornell – lead vocals 
Matt Cameron – drums
Kim Thayil – guitar
Hiro Yamamoto – bass

Production (1990 original version)

Jack Endino – production & engineering, tracks 1–6
Steve Fisk – production, tracks 7–10
Drew Canulette – engineering, tracks 7–10
Soundgarden – co-production on tracks 1–6
Charles Peterson – photography

Production (2013 remastered version)

Jack Endino – remastering, all tracks; production & engineering, tracks 1–7
Steve Fisk – production, tracks 8–11
Drew Canulette – engineering, tracks 8–11
Soundgarden – co-production on tracks 1–7
JJ Golden – remastering, all tracks
Charles Peterson – photography
Katey Miller – logo design

References

1990 compilation albums
Soundgarden compilation albums
Sub Pop compilation albums
Albums produced by Steve Fisk
Albums produced by Chris Cornell
Albums produced by Matt Cameron
Albums produced by Jack Endino